The McDonnells of Knocknacloy are a branch in Ireland of the Highland Scottish clan, Clan Donald. The McDonnells of Knocknacloy are descended from Sorley MacDonnell, son of Alexander Óg MacDonnell and Juliana MacDougall.

They were gallowglass who offered their services to the O'Neills of Tyrone and fought against their cousins the MacDonnell of Antrim and settled at Knocknacloy in County Tyrone.

References
Notes, Historical and Personal, on the Tynekill Branch of the MacDonnell Family., Dublin: BROWNE & NOLAN, Ltd., 1897.

MacDonnells of Knocknacloy